Saint-Maurice is a provincial electoral district located in the Mauricie region of Quebec, Canada. It includes part of the city of Shawinigan; it does not, however, include the parish municipality of Saint-Maurice (although it borders on it).

It was created for the 1867 election, and an electoral district of that name existed even earlier: see Saint-Maurice (Lower Canada) and Saint-Maurice (Province of Canada).

In the change from the 2001 to the 2011 electoral map, its territory was unchanged. Following the change in the 2017 electoral map, the riding will be dissolved into the new riding of Laviolette–Saint-Maurice and Maskinongé.

Members of the Legislative Assembly / National Assembly

Election results

* Result compared to Action démocratique

See also
District of Saint-Maurice (Lower Canada)
District of Saint-Maurice (Province of Canada)
History of Canada
History of Quebec
Mauricie
Politics of Canada
Politics of Quebec
Saint-Maurice Federal Electoral District
Saint-Maurice—Champlain

References

External links
Information
 Elections Quebec

Election results
 Election results (National Assembly)
 Election results (QuébecPolitique)

Maps
 2011 map (PDF)
 2001 map (Flash)
2001–2011 changes (Flash)
1992–2001 changes (Flash)
 Electoral map of Mauricie region 
 Quebec electoral map, 2011 

Former provincial electoral districts of Quebec
Shawinigan